Tod Daniel Wolters (born October 13, 1960) is a retired United States Air Force four-star general who last served as the commander of U.S. European Command and concurrently as NATO's Supreme Allied Commander Europe (SACEUR). He previously served as the commander of U.S. Air Forces in Europe and U.S. Air Forces Africa. He assumed his capstone assignment at the European Command in Germany on May 2, 2019 and at the Allied Command in Belgium on May 3, 2019.

Military career

The son of Air Force Brigadier General Thomas E. Wolters, Wolters received his commission in 1982 as a graduate of the United States Air Force Academy. He has commanded the 19th Fighter Squadron, Elmendorf AFB, Alaska; the 1st Operations Group, Langley AFB, Virginia; the 485th Air Expeditionary Wing, Saudi Arabia; the 47th Flying Training Wing, Laughlin AFB, Texas; the 325th Fighter Wing, Tyndall AFB, Florida; the 9th Air and Space Expeditionary Task Force-Afghanistan; and the Twelfth Air Force, Davis-Monthan Air Force Base, Arizona. He has fought in operations Desert Storm, Southern Watch, Iraqi Freedom and Enduring Freedom.

Wolters served in the Office of the Secretary of the Air Force, as Director of Legislative Liaison, and in Headquarters' staff positions at United States Pacific Command, Headquarters United States Air Force, and Air Force Space Command.

Prior to Wolters' appointment as SACEUR, he was the Director for Operations, Joint Staff, Washington, D.C. He assisted the Chairman of the Joint Chiefs of Staff in fulfilling his responsibilities as the principal military advisor to the President and Secretary of Defense. Wolters develops and provides strategic guidance to the combatant commands and relays communications between the President and the Secretary of Defense to the combatant commanders regarding current operations and plans.

Wolters is a command pilot with more than 5,000 flying hours in the F-15C, F-22, OV-10, T-38 and A-10 aircraft.

Education

1982 Bachelor of Science degree, U.S. Air Force Academy, Colorado Springs, Colo.
1990 Fighter Weapons Instructor Course, U.S. Air Force Fighter Weapons School, Nellis AFB, Nev.
1995 Air Command and Staff College, by correspondence
1996 Armed Forces Staff College, Norfolk, Va.
1996 Master's degree in aeronautical science technology, Embry-Riddle Aeronautical University
2001 Master's degree in strategic studies, Army War College, Carlisle Barracks, Pa.
2004 Senior Executive Fellow, John F. Kennedy School of Government, Harvard University, Cambridge, Mass.
2007 Joint Force Air Component Commander Course, Maxwell AFB, Ala.
2010 Joint Flag Officer Warfighting Course, Maxwell AFB, Ala.
2010 Combined Force Land Component Commander's Course, Carlisle Barracks, Pa.
2014 Fellow, Pinnacle Course, National Defense University, Fort Lesley J. McNair, Washington, D.C.

Assignments

June 1982 – June 1983, student, undergraduate pilot training, Reese AFB, Texas
July 1983 – August 1983, student, fighter lead-in training, Holloman AFB, N.M.
September 1983 – November 1983, student, OV-10 Replacement Training Unit, Patrick AFB, Fla.
November 1983 – June 1984, OV-10 pilot, 704th Tactical Air Support Squadron, Sembach Air Base, West Germany
July 1984 – September 1986, OV-10 instructor pilot and flight examiner, 27th Tactical Air Support Squadron, George AFB, Calif.
October 1986 – November 1986, student, fighter lead-in training, Holloman AFB, N.M.
December 1986 – April 1987, student, F-15 Replacement Training Unit, Tyndall AFB, Fla.
May 1987 – December 1989, F-15 instructor pilot and flight examiner, 53rd Tactical Fighter Squadron, Bitburg AB, West Germany
January 1990 – April 1990, student, U.S. Air Force F-15 Fighter Weapons Instructor Course, Nellis AFB, Nev.
May 1990 – February 1992, Chief of Weapons and Tactics, 9th Tactical Fighter Squadron, Holloman AFB, N.M.
March 1992 – March 1995, assistant operations officer, flight commander and instructor pilot, F-15 Division, U.S. Air Force Fighter Weapons School, Nellis AFB, Nev.
April 1995 – March 1997, aide-de-camp to Commander in Chief, U.S. Pacific Command, Camp H.M. Smith, Hawaii
April 1997 – December 1997, Chief of Safety, 3rd Wing, Elmendorf AFB, Alaska
January 1998 – December 1998, operations officer, 19th Fighter Squadron, Elmendorf AFB, Alaska
January 1999 – June 2000, Commander, 19th Fighter Squadron, Elmendorf AFB, Alaska
July 2000 – June 2001, student, Army War College, Carlisle Barracks, Pa.
June 2001 – April 2002, Chief, Combat Forces Division, Directorate of Operational Requirements, Headquarters U.S. Air Force, Arlington, Va.
May 2002 – July 2004, Commander, 1st Operations Group, Langley AFB, Va. (February 2003 – May 2003, Commander, 485th Air Expeditionary Wing, Southwest Asia)
July 2004 – April 2006, Commander, 47th Flying Training Wing, Laughlin AFB, Texas
June 2006 – March 2008, Commander, 325th Fighter Wing, Tyndall AFB, Fla.
March 2008 – March 2009, Deputy Commander, Political-Military Affairs, Combined Security Transition Command-Afghanistan, U.S. Central Command, Kabul, Afghanistan
April 2009 – May 2011, Director of Air, Space and Cyberspace Operations, Headquarters Air Force Space Command, Peterson AFB, Colo.
May 2011 – May 2012, Commander, 9th Air and Space Expeditionary Task Force – Afghanistan, and Deputy Commander-Air, U.S. Forces-Afghanistan
June 2012 – August 2013, director, Legislative Liaison, Office of the Secretary of the Air Force, the Pentagon, Arlington, Va.
September 2013 – December 2014, Commander, 12th Air Force, Air Combat Command, and Commander, Air Forces Southern, U.S. Southern Command, Davis-Monthan AFB, Ariz.
December 2014 – July 2015, Deputy Chief of Staff for Operations, Headquarters U.S. Air Force, Arlington, Va.
July 2015 – August 2016, Director for Operations, Joint Staff, Arlington, Va.
August 2016 – April 2019, Commander, U.S. Air Forces in Europe; Commander, U.S. Air Forces Africa; Commander, Allied Air Command, headquartered at Ramstein AB, Germany; and Director, Joint Air Power Competency Centre, Kalkar, Germany
May 2019 – July 2022, Commander, U.S. European Command, Stuttgart-Vaihingen, Germany; and Supreme Allied Commander Europe, Mons, Belgium

Summary of joint assignments
April 1995 – March 1997, aide-de-camp to Commander in Chief, U.S. Pacific Command, Camp H.M. Smith, Hawaii, as a major.
March 2008 – March 2009, Deputy Commander, Political-Military Affairs, Combined Security Transition Command-Afghanistan, U.S. Central Command, Kabul, Afghanistan, as a brigadier general.
May 2011 – May 2012, Commander, 9th Air and Space Expeditionary Task Force – Afghanistan, and Deputy Commander-Air, U.S. Forces-Afghanistan, as a major general.
September 2013 – December 2014, Commander, Air Forces Southern, U.S. Southern Command, Davis-Monthan AFB, Ariz., as a lieutenant general.
July 2015 – August 2016, Director for Operations, Joint Staff, Arlington, Va., as a lieutenant general.
May 2019 – July 2022, Commander, U.S. European Command, Stuttgart-Vaihingen, Germany; and Supreme Allied Commander Europe, Mons, Belgium, as a general.

Flight information
Rating: Command Pilot
Flight hours: more than 4,990
Aircraft flown: F-15C, F-22, OV-10, T-38, and A-10

Awards and decorations

He is also a recipient of the Weapons School Graduate Patch .

Effective dates of promotion

See also

List of commanders of USAFE

References

External links

 
 

 
 

 
 

1960 births
Living people
United States Air Force generals
Recipients of the Defense Distinguished Service Medal
Recipients of the Air Force Distinguished Service Medal
Recipients of the Defense Superior Service Medal
Recipients of the Legion of Merit
Recipients of the Air Medal
Military personnel from Kansas
People from Hiawatha, Kansas
United States Air Force Academy alumni